The Bratia is a right tributary of the river Râul Târgului in Romania. It discharges into the Râul Târgului near Negreni. The following villages are situated along the river Bratia, from source to mouth: Cândești, Bratia, Gămăcești, Berevoești, Aninoasa, Valea Siliștii, Vlădești, Poienița, Golești, Bălilești and Băjești.

References

Rivers of Romania
Rivers of Argeș County